Cold Pursuit is a 2019 action thriller film directed by Hans Petter Moland from a screenplay by Frank Baldwin. A co-production between the United States, the United Kingdom, Canada and France, the film stars Liam Neeson, Tom Bateman, Tom Jackson, Emmy Rossum, Domenick Lombardozzi, Julia Jones, John Doman, and Laura Dern.  It is a remake of the 2014 Norwegian film In Order of Disappearance (Kraftidioten), also directed by Moland, and follows a brooding and vengeful snowplow driver (Neeson) who starts killing the members of a drug cartel following the murder of his son.

The film was released in the United States on February 8, 2019, by Lionsgate and Summit Entertainment. It grossed $76 million worldwide and received generally positive reviews from critics, who praised Neeson and Jackson's performances, action sequences and dark humor.

Plot 
After being awarded Citizen of the Year by the fictional ski resort of Kehoe, Colorado, snowplow driver Nels Coxman's quiet life is disrupted when his son dies from a forced heroin overdose. He learns that his son was murdered by a Denver drug cartel. He decides to seek vigilante justice, makes a sawed-off rifle, and kills three members of the cartel, dumping their bodies in a nearby river. Nels's wife Grace (angry at her husband's seemingly cold lack of grief) leaves him. 

The cartel's psychopathic drug lord Trevor "Viking" Calcote, first suspects that these deaths are the work of his rival White Bull, a Ute with whom he has so far avoided conflict. Viking has one of Bull's gangsters murdered, not knowing it is White Bull's only son. This drives White Bull to seek vengeance, and he orders his men to kidnap Viking's young son in retaliation, which starts a gang war. Nels seeks advice from his brother Brock, once a mob enforcer known as Wingman, and learns about Viking. Brock tells Nels that killing Viking requires a hired assassin, and he recommends a transplanted African-American hitman known as "The Eskimo". The Eskimo agrees to kill Viking for 90,000, but decides he can get another 90,000 from Viking by informing him that Nels has hired him for the hit. 

Viking does not appreciate the Eskimo's "lack of professional ethics" and subsequently kills him. He thinks the Eskimo meant Brock Coxman, and he takes Brock in his car. Since Brock is dying of rectal cancer, he claims responsibility for the hits to protect his brother. Viking tries in vain to stop the gang war by using one of his own men as a scapegoat and sending White Bull the man's head. This is insufficient to placate White Bull, who shoots the messenger. Meanwhile, Nels kidnaps Viking's son from his prep school before White Bull's men can do so, in order to draw Viking into an ambush. Nels treats the boy well and protects him from the violence to come. Nels' identity is revealed to Viking by the prep school's janitor. Though promised 10,000 for the tip, he too is killed after his disclosure. 

Both gangs arrive at Nels's workplace, and most of them are killed in the ensuing shootout. Viking, attempting to drive away, is trapped when Nels uses heavy machinery to impale Viking's car with a shorn tree trunk, allowing White Bull to shoot Viking in the chest. He dies when found by Kehoe police detectives Kimberly Dash and Gip. As Nels leaves the property in his snowplow to continue his work, White Bull jumps into the cab, and the two men drive away together with both being satisfied for having avenged their respective children's death.

Cast 

 Liam Neeson as Nels Coxman
 Tom Bateman as Trevor "Viking" Calcote
 Tom Jackson as White Bull Legrew
 Emmy Rossum as Kim Dash, a Kehoe police officer
 Domenick Lombardozzi as Mustang, a senior enforcer for Viking
 Julia Jones as Aya, Viking's Ute former wife and mother of his son
 John Doman as John "Gip" Gipsky, Kim's partner
 Laura Dern as Grace, Nels' wife
 Aleks Paunovic as Detective Osgard
 William Forsythe as Brock "Wingman" Coxman, former hitman for Viking's father
 Raoul Trujillo as Giles "Thorpe" Wills, a member of the Ute people and enforcer for White Bull
 Benjamin Hollingsworth as Tycho "Dexter" Hammel, an enforcer for Viking and Mustang's secret lover
 Michael Eklund as Steve "Speedo" Milliner
 Bradley Stryker as Jacob "Limbo" Rutman
 David O'Hara as Gallum "Sly" Ferrante, an enforcer for Viking
 Christopher Logan as Ameet "Shiv" Anand
 Nathaniel Arcand as Fredrick "Smoke" Alycott
 Ben Cotton as Timothy "Windex" Denois
 Micheál Richardson as Kyle Coxman, Nels' son
 Mitchell Saddleback as Clement "Avalanche" Skenadore
 Manna Nichols as Minya, a secretary at White Bull's headquarters
 Arnold Pinnock as Leighton "The Eskimo" Deeds
 Wesley MacInnes as Dante Ferstel
 Elysia Rotaru as Diner Waitress
 Nicholas Holmes as Ryan Calcote, Viking's son
 Michael Adamthwaite as Jeff "Santa" Christensen
 Elizabeth Thai as Ahn, Brock's wife
 Gus Halper as Anton "Bone" Dinckel
 Kyle Nobess as Simon "Baby Hawk" Legrew, White Bull's son
 Glen Gould as Duane "War Dog" Michell
 Glenn Wrage as Kurt (voice)
 Michael Bean as Parson
 Nels Lennarson as Chuck Schalm, the janitor at Ryan's school

Production 
The participation of actor Liam Neeson, director Hans Petter Moland and producers Michael Shamberg and StudioCanal in making the film, originally titled Hard Powder, was announced in January 2017. In March 2017, Domenick Lombardozzi, Emmy Rossum, Benjamin Hollingsworth, Laura Dern, William Forsythe, Julia Jones, and John Doman joined the cast of the film. The next month, Aleks Paunovic joined.

Principal photography began in March 2017, in Alberta, Canada.
Filming also took place in Vancouver and Fernie, British Columbia, and around Winnipeg and Gimli, Manitoba. While Moland had hoped to shoot in the Banff and Jasper national parks, the permit was denied by Parks Canada, which cited concerns about the film's environmental impact, and over the depiction of the First Nations gangsters led by Tom Jackson's character. Jackson provided a letter in support of the project.

Release 
In November 2017, Summit Entertainment acquired U.S. distribution rights to the film. Its title was changed from Hard Powder to Cold Pursuit, and it was released on February 8, 2019 in the United States, and February 22 in the United Kingdom. The film's February 5, 2019, red carpet premiere was cancelled because of comments made by Neeson the previous day, regarding a past incident in his life, which many interpreted as racist.

The film was released on Ultra HD, Blu-ray, DVD and digital download in the United States on May 14, 2019 by Lionsgate Films. The (Region A) Blu-ray is released as a 2-disc Blu-ray and DVD package. Studio Canal released it in the United Kingdom on June 24, 2019.

Reception

Box office 
Cold Pursuit grossed $32.1 million in the United States and Canada, and $44.1 million in other territories, for a worldwide total of $76.2 million, against a production budget of $60 million.

In the United States and Canada, Cold Pursuit was released alongside What Men Want, The Lego Movie 2: The Second Part and The Prodigy, and was projected to gross $7–10 million from 2,630 theaters in its opening weekend. It made $3.6 million on its first day, including $540,000 from Thursday night previews. It went on to debut to $11 million, finishing third, behind The Lego Movie 2 and What Men Want. In its second weekend the film fell 45% to $6 million, finishing sixth, and then $3.3 million in its third weekend, finishing eighth.

Critical response 
The website's critical consensus reads, "Cold Pursuit delivers the action audiences expect from a Liam Neeson thriller -- along with humor and a sophisticated streak that make this an uncommonly effective remake." It was also included in the site's list of the best action films of 2019. On Metacritic, which assigns a normalized rating to reviews, the film has a weighted average score of 57 out of 100, based on 39 critics, indicating "mixed or average reviews". Audiences polled by CinemaScore gave the film an average grade of "B−" on an A+ to F scale, while those at PostTrak gave it an average 3 out of 5 stars and a 42% "definite recommend".

Chris Nashawaty, writing for Entertainment Weekly, delivered a positive review, grading it a "B+":  Richard Roeper, writing for the Chicago Sun-Times, praised the film, awarding it 3.5 out of 4 stars:

Accolades 
Cold Pursuit was nominated for Best Action or Adventure Film at the 45th Saturn Awards, losing to Mission: Impossible – Fallout.

Controversy 
Liam Neeson was accused of racism after an interview with The Independent at a press junket for the film, published in February 2019. Neeson explained his character's "primal" anger to the interviewer by recounting an experience he had many years ago. A woman close to him said she had been raped by a stranger, and Neeson asked what color skin the attacker had; after learning the attacker was black, Neeson said that for about a week, he "went up and down areas with a cosh ... hoping some 'black bastard' would come out of a pub and have a go" so that Neeson "could kill him". In the interview, Neeson also said he was "ashamed" to recount the experience and that it was "horrible" that he did what he did. "It's awful ... but I did learn a lesson from it, when I eventually thought, 'What the fuck are you doing?'"

In an appearance on Good Morning America, Neeson elaborated on his experience while denying being a racist, saying the incident occurred nearly 40 years ago, that he asked for physical attributes of the rapist other than race, that he would have done the same if the rapist was "a Scot or a Brit or a Lithuanian", that he had purposely gone into "black areas of the city", and that he "did seek help" from a priest after coming to his senses. Neeson said that the lesson of his experience was "to open up, to talk about these things", as there was still underlying "racism and bigotry" in both the United States and Northern Ireland. The controversy of Neeson's comments led to the cancellation of the red carpet event for the premiere of the film.

References

External links 
 

2019 action thriller films
2019 black comedy films
2019 films
American action thriller films
American black comedy films
American films about revenge
American gang films
American remakes of Norwegian films
American vigilante films
British action thriller films
British black comedy films
British films about revenge
French action thriller films
French black comedy films
French films about revenge
British vigilante films
Canadian action thriller films
Canadian black comedy films
Canadian films about revenge
Films directed by Hans Petter Moland
Films scored by George Fenton
Films set in Colorado
Films shot in Alberta
Films shot in British Columbia
StudioCanal films
Lionsgate films
Summit Entertainment films
2010s English-language films
2010s American films
2010s British films
2010s French films
2010s Canadian films
2010s vigilante films
English-language French films
English-language Canadian films
Race-related controversies in film
Obscenity controversies in film
Film controversies in the United States
Advertising and marketing controversies in film